Young Woodley is a 1925 play by the British writer John Van Druten. It concerns a schoolboy at a top British public school who falls in love with his headmaster's wife and is eventually expelled. Because of its negative depiction of public school life, and its controversial subject matter, the play originally was banned in the United Kingdom and only staged in 1928. However, it was a major success in the United States, and Van Druten moved there to work. The ban in Britain was lifted, and the play ran for over 400 performances in the West End, making a star of its lead Frank Lawton. It was revived at the Finborough Theatre, London, in 2007. It was included in Burns Mantle's The Best Plays of 1925-1926.

Adaptations

A 1928 silent version Young Woodley, directed by Thomas Bentley, was made at Cricklewood Studios but never released.

In 1930 the play was adapted into a film by British International Pictures. It was directed again by Bentley with Lawton's reprising his stage role. It also starred Madeleine Carroll, Frank Lawton and Sam Livesey. The film is notable for its staginess and was not a success with audiences.

Bibliography

 Richards, Jeffrey. The Age of the Dream Palace: Cinema and Society in Britain, 1930-1939. Routledge & Kegan Paul, 1984.

References

External links
 Full text of the play at HathiTrust Digital Library

Plays by John Van Druten
1925 plays
British plays adapted into films
Plays set in England